The Montjuïc circuit is a former street circuit located on the Montjuïc mountain in Barcelona, Catalonia, Spain. The circuit was also the venue for the Spanish motorcycle Grand Prix from 1950 to 1968, and then hosted the event on even-numbered years until 1976. The last Formula One Grand Prix held there in 1975, is notable for both a fatal crash that led to Formula One abandoning the venue and the only occasion to date that a female driver has scored World Championship points.

History 
By 1908 international motorsport was conducted at the Circuit Baix Penedès with the Copa Catalunya. In 1923 the first Great automobile Prize of Spain in the permanent Sitges Terramar circuit was run near Barcelona. In 1932 a race was held on a street circuit with the start in the Montjuïc Park, wooded parkland on a hill above the city's harbour. The course of the 1933 east circuit of that race became the Montjuïc Circuit proper, holding the Penya Rhin Grand Prix.

In 1968, Montjuïc was selected as the venue for the Spanish Grand Prix, which had been held at the Jarama circuit in Madrid, with the inaugural Grand Prix being held there on 4 May 1969. The variable character of the anticlockwise course (with one half slow and the other very fast) made setting the cars up correctly a challenge.

The 1975 Spanish Grand Prix was marked by tragedy. Many drivers felt that the circuit was unsafe, and two time world champion Emerson Fittipaldi withdrew in protest before the start of the race. On lap 26 the Embassy Hill-Lola car of Rolf Stommelen left the track, killing four people. The race was subsequently stopped before half distance and half points awarded, with Jochen Mass being recorded as the winner. Lella Lombardi became the first and only female driver to score world championship points, taking 0.5 points for 6th place. Formula One never returned to the circuit after the accident.

The circuit of Montjuïc was also the scene of the 24 hours of Montjuïc, a motorcycle endurance race from 1960 to 1982.

The area where the circuit was located is now part of Anella Olímpica, where many Venues of the 1992 Summer Olympics are now located.

In 2004, the city council of Barcelona decided to mark the layout of the old circuit.

On 13–14 October 2007 the circuit was used for the Martini Legends, to honour the 75th anniversary of the circuit. Signalling the return of Formula One cars to Montjuïc, Emerson Fittipaldi (re-)appeared in his Lotus 72, and Marc Gené drove a contemporary Ferrari.

Lap records
The official race lap records at the Montjuïc circuit are listed as:

References

External links
 Montjuïc Park History
 (news in ESPN Sports)
 The circuit in OpenStreetMap
 The streets of the former circuit in Google Maps

Montjuïc
Formula One circuits
Grand Prix motorcycle circuits
Motorsport venues in Catalonia
Motorsport venues in Spain
Spanish Grand Prix
Sports venues in Barcelona
Defunct motorsport venues in Spain
Defunct sports venues in Catalonia